Yujiulü Doulan (pinyin: Yùjiǔlǘ Dòulún) (?–492) was khagan of the Rouran (485–492) with the title of Fugudun Khagan (伏古敦可汗). He was the son of Yujiulü Yucheng.

Reign 
He succeeded his father in 485. His reign saw the raids on the Northern Wei border resumed but did not bring visible results. In Chinese sources, the years of his reign are called the "period of mercy", but at this time in the khaganate there were frequent internecine wars of the high ranking nobles. When nobles asked from Doulun to make peace with Wei, he accused them of treason and ordered them to be executed, together with the whole clans and up to three tribes.

He was defeated by Gaoche ruler Afuzhiluo (阿伏至羅) together with his younger cousin Qiongqi (穷奇), they managed their clans of over 100,000 yurts to escape from the pursuing armies, led by Doulun and his uncle Nagai by defeating them in 487. In 488, he invaded Yiwu with 3000 soldiers and returned to steppes. Following it, eastern wing of Rouran fell into Khitan and Kumo Xi hands in 490.

Starting from 492, Doulun's cruelty and losses in battles made nobles to grow distressful. They persuaded Nagai to be the khagan. Nagai initially refused and said that Doulun was a legal khagan until death. This was a signal for nobles who killed Doulun and his mother in a coup d'état, brought their corpses to Nagai, subsequently proclaiming him khagan.

References

Sources 

History of the Northern Dynasties, vol. 86.
Book of Wei, vol 103.

 

Khagans of the Rouran